Needmore is a small unincorporated community in north central Terry County, Texas, United States.

History
Early settlers of the region included the Beasley, Green, Brock, and Gibson families. A school was established around 1904 and eventually formed one of the first four school districts in the county. By the late 1960s, Needmore had a general store, a cotton gin, and a population of four. Today, only the cotton gin is still operating.  In 2000, the population was 55.

Geography
Needmore lies on the high plains of the Llano Estacado at the intersection of U.S. Highway 385 and Farm to Market Road 211.

In the state of Texas,  four small communities share the name Needmore and the high plains area of the Llano Estacado has two. Both are rural agricultural communities with cotton gins.

The terrain surrounding Needmore consists of level plains that at one time were covered with grassland vegetation and grazing bison. Today, the bison are gone and the shortgrass prairie has been replaced by plowed cropland, where cotton, sorghum, and winter wheat are grown.  No flowing streams remain  near Needmore, but a dry stream channel called Lost Draw passes to the south of the community. Numerous shallow lakes called “playas” dot the landscape surrounding Needmore.  Most of these playas hold water for a short time after rain, then dry and remain dry for extended periods. Some of the larger saline playas to the southeast, such as Rich Lake and Mound Lake, provide refuge for migratory waterfowl flying between Canada and Mexico.

Education
The town of Needmore once had its own school, which became an independent district in 1929. In the early 1940s, the Needmore school was consolidated with the Meadow school. Today, the town of Needmore is served by the Meadow Independent School District, home to the Meadow High School Broncos.

See also
Yellow House Draw
Llano Estacado
Blackwater Draw
West Texas

References

External links

Photos of the Llano Estacado

Unincorporated communities in Terry County, Texas
Unincorporated communities in Texas